The 19th Robert Awards ceremony was held on 3 February 2002 in Copenhagen, Denmark. Organized by the Danish Film Academy, the awards honoured the best in Danish and foreign film of 2001.

Honorees

Best Danish Film 
 Kira's Reason: A Love Story – Ole Christian Madsen

Best Children's Film 
 Min søsters børn – Tomas Villum Jensen

Best Director 
 Ole Christian Madsen – Kira's Reason: A Love Story

Best Screenplay 
 Ole Christian Madsen & Mogens Rukov – Kira's Reason: A Love Story

Best Actor in a Leading Role 
 Nikolaj Lie Kaas – Truly Human

Best Actress in a Leading Role 
 Stine Stengade – Kira's Reason: A Love Story

Best Actor in a Supporting Role 
 Troels Lyby – Shake It All About

Best Actress in a Supporting Role 
 Birthe Neumann – Chop Chop

Best Cinematography 
 Jens Schlosser – The King Is Alive

Production Design 
 Søren Skjær – Chop Chop

Best Costume Design 
 Stine Gudmundsen-Holmgreen –

Makeup 
 Agneta von Gegerfelt –

Best Special Effects 
 Hummer Højmark, Steen Lyders and Kris Kolodziejski –

Best Sound Design 
 Nino Jacobsen – Shake It All About

Best Editing 
 Søren B. Ebbe – Kira's Reason: A Love Story

Best Score 
 Tim Stahl & John Guldberg (Laid Back) –

Best Song 
 "Little White Doll" -  -

Best Documentary Short 
  – Dorte Høegh Brask

Best Documentary Feature 
  – Sami Saif &

Best Short Featurette 
  – Amir Rezazadeh

Best Long Featurette 
  – Klaus Kjeldsen

Best Non-American Film 
 Moulin Rouge! – Baz Luhrmann

Best American Film 
 The Lord of the Rings: The Fellowship of the Ring – Peter Jackson

Audience Award 
 Shake It All About

See also 

 2002 Bodil Awards

References

External links 
  

2001 film awards
Robert Awards ceremonies
2002 in Copenhagen